Tall, Tan, and Terrific is a 1946 American film directed by Bud Pollard and starring Mantan Moreland.

Premise
A musical comedy set at Harlem's Golden Slipper Club, it features efforts to free someone accused of murder.

Cast
Mantan Moreland as Mantan Moreland
Monte Hawley as "Handsome" Harry Hansom
Francine Everett as Miss Tall, Tan and Terrific
Dots Johnson as The Duke
Rudy Toombs as Lefty Gomez
Barbara "Butterbeans" Bradford as Club photographer
Lou Swarz

References

External links

1946 films
1946 musical films
1946 short films
Race films
American musical films
American black-and-white films
1940s English-language films
1940s American films